Rickey Claitt (born April 12, 1957) is a former American football running back in the National Football League for the Washington Redskins.  He played college football at Bethune-Cookman College.  His son, Rickey Jr., was a point guard for the Oregon State Beavers basketball team
from 2007 to 2009

1957 births
Living people
American football running backs
Bethune–Cookman Wildcats football players
Washington Redskins players
People from Sylvester, Georgia
Players of American football from Georgia (U.S. state)